The siege of Szigetvár or the Battle of Szigeth (pronunciation: [ˈsiɡɛtvaːr] ;) was a siege of the fortress of Szigetvár, Kingdom of Hungary, that blocked Sultan Suleiman's line of advance towards Vienna in 1566. The battle was fought between the defending forces of the Habsburg monarchy under the leadership of Nikola IV Zrinski, former Ban of Croatia, and the invading Ottoman army under the nominal command of Sultan Suleiman the Magnificent ( Süleymān).

After the Battle of Mohács in 1526, which resulted in the end of the independent Kingdom of Hungary, Ferdinand I was elected King by the nobles of both Hungary and Croatia. This was followed by a series of conflicts with the Habsburgs and their allies, fighting against the Ottoman Empire. In the Little War in Hungary both sides exhausted themselves after sustaining heavy casualties. The Ottoman campaign in Hungary ceased until the offensive against Szigetvár.

In January 1566 Suleiman went to war for the last time. The siege of Szigetvár was fought from 5 August to 8 September 1566 and, though it resulted in an Ottoman victory, there were heavy losses on both sides. Both commanders died during the battle  Zrinski in the final charge and Suleiman in his tent from natural causes. More than 20,000 Ottomans had fallen during the attacks and almost all of Zrinski's 2,300-man garrison was killed, with most of the final 600 men killed on the last day. Although the battle was an Ottoman victory, it stopped the Ottoman push to Vienna that year. Vienna was not threatened again until the Battle of Vienna in 1683.

The importance of the battle was considered so great that the French clergyman and statesman Cardinal Richelieu was reported to have described it as "the battle that saved (Western) civilization". The battle is still famous in Croatia and Hungary and inspired both the Hungarian epic poem The Siege of Sziget and the Croatian opera Nikola Šubić Zrinski.

Background

On 29 August 1526 the forces of the Kingdom of Hungary led by King Louis II were defeated at the Battle of Mohács by Ottoman forces led by Sultan Suleiman the Magnificent. Louis died in the battle which resulted in the end of the independent Kingdom of Hungary, as he died without an heir. Both Hungary and Croatia became disputed territories with claims from both the Habsburg and Ottoman empires. Ferdinand I from the House of Habsburg, brother of Holy Roman Emperor Charles V, married the sister of Louis II and was elected King by the nobles of both Hungary and Croatia. On 1 January 1527, the Croatian nobles convened the Parliament at Cetin and unanimously elected Ferdinand I, Archduke of Austria as their king, and confirmed the succession to him and his heirs. In return for the throne, Archduke Ferdinand promised to respect the historic rights, freedoms, laws, and customs the Croats had when united with the Hungarian kingdom and to defend Croatia from Ottoman invasion.

The throne of Hungary became the subject of a dynastic dispute between Ferdinand and John Zápolya from Transylvania. Suleiman had promised to make Zápolya the ruler of all Hungary. Ferdinand set out to enforce his claim on Hungary and captured Buda from John Zápolya in 1527, only to relinquish his hold on it in 1529 when an Ottoman counter-attack stripped Ferdinand of all his territorial gains during 1527 and 1528. The siege of Vienna in 1529 was the first attempt by Suleiman the Magnificent to capture the Austrian capital. This siege signalled the pinnacle of Ottoman power and the maximum extent of Ottoman expansion in central Europe.

Little War

The years from 1529 to 1552 were known as the "Little War". Following Suleiman's unsuccessful siege of Vienna in 1529, Ferdinand launched a counter-attack in 1530 to regain the initiative. An assault on Buda was driven off by John Zápolya, although Ferdinand was successful elsewhere—capturing Gran (Esztergom) and other forts along the Danube river, a vital strategic frontier.

Suleiman's response came in 1532 when he led a massive army of over 120,000 troops to besiege Vienna again. Ferdinand withdrew his army, leaving only 700 men with no cannons and a few guns to defend Güns (Koszeg) although Ibrahim Pasha, the Grand Vizier of the Ottomans, did not realize how poorly defended Koszeg was. Suleiman came to join him shortly after the siege of Güns had started. For more than 25 days, Croatian captain Nikola Jurišić and his garrison of 800 Croats held out against 19 full-scale assaults and an incessant bombardment by the over 120,000 Ottomans. As a result, the city was offered a surrender on favourable terms and, although the offer was rejected, the Ottomans retreated leading to a peace treaty between Ferdinand and Suleiman. John Zápolya was recognized as the King of Hungary by the Habsburgs, although as an Ottoman vassal.

The treaty did not satisfy either John Zápolya or Ferdinand, and their armies began skirmishes along the borders. In 1537, Ferdinand attacked John's forces at Osijek in violation of the treaty. The siege was a disaster of similar magnitude to that of Mohács, with an Ottoman relief army smashing the Austrians. Rather than attack Vienna again, Suleiman attacked Otranto in southern Italy. At the naval Battle of Preveza in 1538, the Ottomans inflicted another defeat on the Habsburg-led coalition.

John Zápolya died in 1540 and was succeeded by his infant son John II Sigismund Zápolya. For much of his reign, the country was governed by his mother Isabella Jagiellon, with continued support from Suleiman. John II remained the nominal King of Hungary until he abdicated in 1570 and returned the country to Habsburg rule.

A further humiliating defeat was inflicted on the Habsburgs in the 1541 siege of Buda, when the Ottomans responded to a request for help from Isabella Jagiellon. In April 1543, Suleiman launched another campaign in Hungary, taking back Bran and other forts and returning much of Hungary to Ottoman control. In August 1543, the Ottomans succeeded in the siege of Esztergom, which was followed by the capture of three Hungarian cities: Székesfehérvár, Siklós, and Szeged, offering better security for Buda.

Another peace agreement between the Habsburgs and the Ottomans lasted until 1552, when Suleiman decided to attack Eger. The siege proved futile, and the Habsburg victory reversed a period of territorial losses in Hungary. Their retention of Eger gave the Austrians good reason to believe that Hungary was still contested ground and the Ottoman campaign in Hungary ended, until its revival in 1566.

Campaign of 1566

In January 1566 Sultan Suleiman I had ruled the Ottoman Empire for 46 years and went to war for the last time. He was 72 years old and, although having gout to the extent that he was carried on a litter, he nominally commanded his thirteenth military campaign. On 1 May 1566 the Sultan left Constantinople at the head of one of the largest armies he had ever commanded.

His opposite number, Count Nikola IV Zrinski, was one of the largest landholders in the Kingdom of Croatia, a seasoned veteran of border warfare, and a Ban (Croatian royal representative) from 1542 to 1556. In his early life he distinguished himself in the siege of Vienna and pursued a successful military career.

Suleiman's forces reached Belgrade on 27 June after a forty-nine-day march. Here he met with John II Sigismund Zápolya who he earlier promised to make the ruler of all Hungary. Learning of Zrinski's success in an attack upon a Turkish encampment at Siklós, Suleiman decided to postpone his attack on Eger and instead attack Zrinski's fortress at Szigetvár to eliminate him as a threat.

Siege

The advanced guard of the Turks arrived on 2 August 1566 and the defenders made several successful sorties causing considerable loss to the Turks. The Sultan arrived with the main force on 5 August and his big war tent was erected on the Similehov hill, giving him a view of the battle. The Sultan stayed in his camp where he received verbal battle progress reports from his Grand Vizier Sokollu Mehmed Pasha, the real operational commander of the Ottoman forces.

Count Zrinski found himself besieged by a hostile army of at least 150,000 soldiers with powerful artillery. Zrinski had assembled a force of around 2,300 Croatian and Hungarian soldiers prior to the siege. These consisted of his personal forces, and those of his friends and allies, primarily Count Gašpar Alapić and lieutenants Miklouš Kobak, Petar Patačić, and Vuk Paprutović. The majority of the defenders were Croatian, with a significant Hungarian contingent represented in both the men-at-arms and the leadership.

Szigetvár was divided by water into three sections: the old town, the new town, and the castle—each of which was linked to the next by bridges and to the land by causeways. Although it was not built on particularly high ground, the inner castle, which occupied much of the area of today's castle, was not directly accessible to the attackers. This was because two other baileys had to be taken and secured before a final assault on the inner castle could be launched.

When the Sultan appeared before the fortress, he saw the walls hung with red cloth, as though for a festive reception, and a single great cannon thundered once to greet the mighty warrior monarch. The siege began on 6 August when Suleiman ordered a general assault on the ramparts, which was repulsed. Despite being undermanned, and greatly outnumbered, the defenders were sent no reinforcements from Vienna by the imperial army.

After over a month of exhausting and bloody struggle, the few remaining defenders retreated into the old town for their last stand. The Sultan tried to entice Zrinski to surrender, ultimately offering him leadership of Croatia under Ottoman influence. Count Zrinski did not reply and continued to fight. Emperor Maximilian and 80,000 soldiers stood in the vicinity of Győr but did not attack the Ottomans to take the pressure off Szigetvár.

The fall of the castle appeared inevitable but the Ottoman high command hesitated. On 6 September Suleiman died in his tent. His death was kept secret at great effort, with only the Sultan's innermost circle knowing of his demise. This was because the Ottomans feared that their soldiers would give up the battle if they knew that their leader died, so his death was kept secret for 48 days. A courier was dispatched from the camp with a message for Suleiman's successor, Selim II. The courier may not even have known the content of the message he delivered to distant Asia Minor within a mere eight days.

Final battle
The final battle began on 7 September, the day after Suleiman's demise. By this time, the fortress walls had been reduced to rubble by mining with explosives and wood fueled fires at the corners of the walls. In the morning an all-out attack began with fusillades from small arms, "Greek fire", and a concentrated cannonade: according to Robert William Fraser, more than 10,000 large cannonballs were shot into the fortress during the siege. Soon the castle, the last stronghold within Szigetvár, was set ablaze and cinders fell into the apartments of the count.

The Ottoman army swarmed through the city, drumming and yelling. Zrinski prepared for a last charge addressing his troops: 

Zrinski did not allow the final assault to break into the castle. As the Turks were pressing forwards along a narrow bridge the defenders suddenly flung open the gate and fired a large mortar loaded with broken iron, killing 600 attackers. Zrinski then ordered a charge and led his remaining 600 troops out of the castle. He received two musket wounds in his chest and was killed shortly afterwards by an arrow to the head. Some of his force retired into the castle.

The Turks took the castle and most of the defenders were slain. A few of the captured defenders were spared by Janissaries who had admired their courage, with only seven defenders managing to escape through the Ottoman lines. Zrinski's corpse was beheaded and it is considered his head was sent by Mehmed Pasha to Budin Pasha Sokullu Mustafa, or to new Sultan Selim II, but eventually, the head was buried by son Juraj IV Zrinski, Boldizsár Batthyány, and Ferenc Tahy in September 1566 at the Pauline monastery in Sveta Jelena, Šenkovec, Croatia. His body received an honourable burial by a Turk who had been his prisoner, and well treated by him.

Powder magazine explosion
Before leading the final sortie by the castle garrison, Zrinski ordered a fuse be lit to the powder magazine, although whether this ultimately happened is disputed. After cutting down the last of the defenders the besiegers poured into the fortress. The Ottoman Army entered the remains of Szigetvár and fell into the booby trap; thousands perished in the blast when the castle's magazine exploded.

The Vizier Ibrahim's life was saved by one of Zrinski's household who warned him of the trap when the Vizier and his troops searched for treasure and interrogated the survivors. While inquiring about the treasure the prisoner replied that it had been long expended, but that 3,000 lbs of powder were under their feet to which a slow match had been attached. The Vizier and his mounted officers had just enough time to escape but 3,000 Turks perished in the explosion.

Aftermath

Almost all of Zrinski's garrison was wiped out after the final battle. Ottoman casualties were also heavy. Three pashas, 7,000 Janissaries, and 28,000 other soldiers are said to have perished. Sources vary on the exact number with estimates ranging from 20,000 to 35,000.

After the battle the Grand Vizier forged bulletins in the Sultan's name, proclaiming victory. These announced that the Sultan regretted that his current state of health prevented him from continuing with the successful campaign. His body was returned to Constantinople while the inner circle of officials pretended to keep up communication with him. Turkish sources state that the illusion was maintained for three weeks and that even the Sultan's personal physician was strangled as a precaution.

It is likely that the long journey and the siege had a detrimental effect on the Sultan's health. His death meant that any advances were postponed as the Grand Vizier had to return to Constantinople for the succession of the new Sultan, Selim II. Even if Suleiman had lived his army could not have achieved much in the short time that remained between the fall of Szigeth and the onset of winter. The prolonged resistance at Szigeth delayed the Ottoman push to Vienna.

Two ambassadors were sent by Emperor Maximilian: Croatian Antun Vrančić and Styrian Christoph Teuffenbach. They arrived in Istanbul on 26 August 1567 and were well received by Sultan Selim II. An agreement ending the war between the Austrian and Ottoman empires was reached on 17 February 1568, after five months of negotiations with Sokollu Mehmed Pasha (also known as Mehmed-paša Sokolović, being originally from Bosnia). The Treaty of Adrianople was signed on 21 February 1568. Sultan Selim II agreed to an eight-year truce, although the agreement brought 25 years of (relative) peace between the Empires until the Long War. The truce was conditional and Maximilian agreed to pay an annual tribute of 30,000 ducats.

Legacy and depictions in art

The Croatian Renaissance poet and writer Brne Karnarutić, from Zadar, wrote The Conquest of the City of Sziget (Vazetje Sigeta grada) sometime before 1573. His work was posthumously published in 1584 in Venice. This is the first Croatian historical epic dealing with national history and the Battle of Szigetvár. It was inspired by Marko Marulić's Judita, which in turn is inspired by the Biblical Book of Judith.

The battle was also immortalized in the Hungarian epic poem Szigeti Veszedelem ("Peril of Sziget"), written in fifteen parts by Zrinski's great-grandson Nicholas VII of Zrin (also a Ban of Croatia) in 1647 and published in 1651. This was one of the first such epics in Hungarian and was also inspired by Marulić's Judita. Kenneth Clark's renowned history Civilisation lists the Szigeti Veszedelem as one of the major literary achievements of the 17th century. In spite of the author and other members of Zrinski family being fierce enemies of the Turks, the poem never demonizes them. The Turks are portrayed as human beings and a love story between Deliman the Tatar and the Sultan's daughter Cumilla is interwoven into the main plot. Petar Zrinski, the brother of Nikola VII Zrinski, published Opsida Sigecka (1647–8) in Croatian—not surprising since the Zrinski family were bilingual.

Another Croatian nobleman warrior-poet Pavao Ritter Vitezović (1652–1713) wrote about the battle. His poem Odiljenje sigetsko ("The Sziget Farewell"), first published in 1684, reminisces about the event without rancour or crying for revenge. The last of the four cantos is titled "Tombstones" and consists of epitaphs for the Croatian and Turkish warriors who died during the siege, paying equal respect to both.

Karl Theodor Körner, 1791–1813, a German poet, wrote in 1812 a drama, Zriny, about the battle. Ivan Zajc's 1876 opera Nikola Šubić Zrinski is his most famous and popular work in Croatia. This recounts the heroic defiance of the Croats towards the Turks, as a metaphor for their later nationalist impulses within the Habsburg monarchy. Zrinski is depicted in the plot as a 16th-century Croatian hero who defeated the Turks a couple of times before perishing sacrificially, along with his family and close supporters, in the siege of Szigeth castle. The opera is patriotic with a famous aria "U boj, u boj".

Gallery

Notes

References

Footnotes

Bibliography

Krokar, James P. (DePaul University) (1997) The Ottoman Presence in Southeastern Europe, 16th–19th Centuries: A View in Maps, Chicago: The Newberry Library. viewable online

Further reading

External links

Hungarian epic poem "Peril of Sziget", written by Nicholas VII Zrinski 
Nicholas Zrinski and Battle of Szigeth  

Conflicts in 1566
1566 in Europe
Szigetvar
Szigetvar
Szigetvar
Szigetvar
Szigetvar
Military history of Hungary
Siege of Szigetvar
Szigetvar
1566 in the Ottoman Empire
1566 in the Habsburg monarchy
Szigetvár